Arthur Hovhannisyan is an Armenian-Russian Kyokushin karateka (5th dan).

Hovhannisyan began competing in swimming and boxing at age of eight before beginning kyokushin at fifteen. He won both the Moscow and the Armenian championships in 1995, the Russian championship in 1996, the British National Open Tournament in 1997, and the European Championship in 2005. He has been vice-president of Kyokushinkai Federation of Armenia since 1999. In 2005, he moved to the International Karate Organization (IKO) headquarters in Tokyo.

In 2008, Russian TV channel Боец ("Fighter", boets.ru) made a film about Hovhannisyan, entitled Горец ("Highlander", Hovhannisyan's nickname referring to his Armenian heritage).

In 2009, he completed a 100-man kumite under the supervision of Shokei Matsui.

References

A Gorglyev, Dojo (Додзё) no. 1 (2004, online version at kyokushin-kai.ru)

External links
 100 боев Артура Оганесяна (bushido.ru)
 АРТУР ОГАНЕСЯН. ГОРЕЦ. (boets.ru)
 Оганесян Артур Эдуардович (hayazg.info)

1975 births
Living people
Armenian male karateka
Russian male karateka
Kyokushin kaikan practitioners
Russian sportspeople of Armenian descent